The 2016 Seattle Sounders FC 2 season is the club's second year of existence, and their second season in the United Soccer League, the third tier of the United States Soccer Pyramid. Including previous Seattle Sounders franchises, this is the 36th season of a soccer team playing in the Seattle metro area.

Current roster

Competitions

USL regular season

Standings

Results summary

Matches

References

2016 USL season
American soccer clubs 2016 season
Seattle Sounders
Sounders
Tacoma Defiance seasons
Soccer in Washington (state)